The 2015 Supercar Challenge powered by Pirelli was the fifteenth Supercar Challenge season since it replaced the Supercar Cup in 2001. It began at Circuit Park Zandvoort on April 3 and ended at TT Circuit Assen on October 18. Roger Grouwels, Arjan van der Zwaan and Robert de Graaff entered the season as the defending Drivers' Champions in the highest class, the Super GT.

Calendar

Entry list

Super GT/GTB

Notes

Supersport/Sport

Notes

Superlights 1/Superlights 2

Race results

Championship standings

Scoring system
Championship points are awarded for the first ten positions in each race. The pole-sitter in Race 1 and Race 2 and the driver with the fastest lap in Race 1 and Race 2 also receive one point. The grid for Race 1 is decided by a normal qualifying, but the grid for Race 2 is decided by everyone's second best time in qualifying. If a guest driver gets Pole Position, the point will go to the best qualified regular driver. If a guest driver has the fastest lap, the point will go to the regular driver with the fastest lap. Entries are required to complete 75% of the winning car's (per division) race distance in order to be classified and earn points. Participants who join less than 4 events (8 races) will be treated as guest drivers and will not be included in the scoring and will not receive any points. All results shall count towards the year-end standings. There are no scratch results. If there are in a division on average less than 6 participants the overall points standing will be reduced with 75%.

Super GT/GTB/Supersport/Sport (Race 1 and Race 2)

Superlights (Race 1)

Superlights (Race 2)

Notes
 At the Racing Festival Spa the scoring system for the Superlights races was reversed, so for Race 1 a maximum of 22 points was available and for Race 2 a maximum of 12 points was available.

Drivers' Championship

Super GT/GTB

Supersport/Sport

See also
Supercar Challenge (series)

References

External links

2015 in motorsport
2015 in Dutch motorsport
2015 in European sport